Mini Psycho Clown (born January 30, 1985) is the ring name of a Mexican Luchador enmascarado, or masked professional wrestler currently signed to Lucha Libre AAA Worldwide (AAA) in the Mini-Estrella division. He is a former AAA World Mini-Estrella Champion. Mini Psycho Clown's real name is not a matter of public record, as is often the case with masked wrestlers in Mexico where their private lives are kept a secret from the wrestling fans.

Championships and accomplishments
Lucha Libre AAA Worldwide
AAA World Mini-Estrella Championship (1 time)

References

1985 births
Living people
Professional wrestlers from Mexico City
Masked wrestlers
Mexican male professional wrestlers
Mini-Estrella wrestlers
Unidentified wrestlers
21st-century professional wrestlers